The Benin men's national under-18 basketball team is a national basketball team of Benin, administered by the Fédération Béninoise de Basketball.
It represents the country in international under-18 (under age 18) basketball competitions.

See also
Benin men's national basketball team
Benin men's national under-16 basketball team
Benin women's national under-18 basketball team

References

External links
Archived records of Benin team participations

Basketball teams in Benin
Men's national under-18 basketball teams
Basketball